The Anthology Club, or Anthology Society, was a literary society based in Boston, Massachusetts by the Rev. William Emerson, father of Ralph Waldo Emerson.  It operated from 1804 until 1811.

History

The society organized in response to the first publication, and first failure for want of patronage, of the Monthly Anthology. As recorded in the History of the Boston Athenaeum, an enterprising firm of publishers, "being desirous that the work should be continued, applied to the Rev. William Emerson, a clergyman of the place, distinguished for energy and literary taste; and by his exertions several gentlemen of Boston and its vicinity, conspicuous for talent and zealous for literature, were induced to engage in conducting the work, and for this purpose they formed themselves into a Society. This Society was not completely organized until the year 1805, when Dr. Gardiner was elected President, and William Emerson Vice-President. The Society thus formed maintained its existence with reputation for about six years, and issued ten octavo volumes from the press, constituting one of the most lasting and honorable monuments of the literature of the period."

Early club members included Samuel Cooper Thacher, Joseph Stevens Buckminster, and Joseph Tuckerman, pastors of churches in Boston and vicinity, John Sylvester John Gardiner, the rector of Trinity Church, president of the club throughout the whole period of its existence, and one of the most frequent contributors to its periodical, and William Tudor. Later members included Charles Stewart Dana, Alexander Hill Everett, and John Collins Warren. [William Smith Shaw, President John Adams' former Personal Secretary.]

The club's publication, the Monthly Anthology and Boston Review, or Magazine of Polite Literature, and had contributors including John Quincy Adams, Daniel Webster, and many scholars. However, with the death of Emerson in 1811, the Anthology ceased publication. The famous North American Review, which started bimonthly publication in 1815, under the direction of the Anthology Club, is generally considered a revival of the earlier magazine.

The Boston Athenæum is an outgrowth of the Anthology Club.

Members

 Jacob Bigelow
 Joseph Stevens Buckminster
 Edmund Trowbridge Dana
 William Emerson
 Alexander Hill Everett
 Robert Field
 John Sylvester John Gardiner
 Robert Hallowell Gardiner
 John Gorham
 Thomas Gray
 Joseph Head Jr.
 James Jackson
 John Thornton Kirkland
 Joseph McKean
 Andrews Norton
 Andrew Ritchie
 Winthrop Sargent
 James Savage
 William Smith Shaw
 John Stickney
 Samuel Cooper Thacher
 George Ticknor
 Joseph Tuckerman
 William Tudor
 Arthur Maynard Walter
 John Collins Warren
 Benjamin Welles
 William Wells
 Sidney Willard

References

Further reading
 Dole, Nathan Haskell (1909). "The Anthology Club." In:  Eighth Year Book of The Bibliophile Society. Boston, Mass.: The Bibliophile Society.

1804 establishments in Massachusetts
Literary societies
Clubs and societies in Boston
Cultural history of Boston
19th century in Boston